The Ruše Lodge, or the Tine Lodge at Areh is a mountain lodge in the Pohorje Mountains (northeastern Slovenia), built by locals in 1907. It is open through the whole year.

History
Before World War II, three lodges – Ruše Lodge, Čander Lodge (named after an old Pohorje family Robnik–Čander), and Planika, together with St. Henry's Church, formed a mountain resort. The lodges were burned during the war. The current lodge was built in 1946 and expanded in 1977. Due to the demand, a new Čander Lodge was also built.

Starting points 
3½ hr drive from Ruše, passing an old limekiln
4 hr drive from Ruše over Smolnik, passing the Šumnik Falls
5 hr drive from Slovenska Bistrica, passing the Štuhec Lodge
3½ hr drive from Fram through he village of Planica
2 hr drive from Šmartno na Pohorju passing the Videc drag lift
2½ hr drive from Šmartno na Pohorju through Bojtina, passing the Zgornji Bojčnik Farm
 By car from Hoče, or from Ruše or Slovenska Bistrica

See also
 Slovenian Mountain Hiking Trail

References
 Slovenska planinska pot, Planinski vodnik, PZS, 2012, Milenko Arnejšek - Prle, Andraž Poljanec

External links
 Routes, Description & Photos

Mountain huts in Slovenia
Pohorje